Maizery is a former commune in the Moselle department in north-eastern France. On 1 June 2016, it was merged into the new commune of Colligny-Maizery. Its population was 178 in 2019.

See also
 Communes of the Moselle department

References 

Former communes of Moselle (department)
Populated places disestablished in 2016